Legionella jamestowniensis is a Gram-negative bacterium from the genus Legionella which was isolated from wet soil in Jamestown, New York.

References

External links
Type strain of Legionella jamestowniensis at BacDive -  the Bacterial Diversity Metadatabase

Legionellales
Bacteria described in 1985